Honeytown is an unincorporated community in Wooster Township, Wayne County, in the U.S. state of Ohio. Apple Creek flows past the town site.

A post office called Honeytown was established in 1884, and closed in 1885.

References

Unincorporated communities in Wayne County, Ohio
Unincorporated communities in Ohio